"Fever" is a song written by Eddie Cooley and Otis Blackwell, who used the pseudonym John Davenport. It was originally recorded by American R&B singer Little Willie John for his debut album, Fever (1956), and released as a single in April of the same year. The song topped the Billboard R&B Best Sellers in the US and peaked at number 24 on the Billboard pop chart.  It was received positively by music critics and included on several lists of the best songs during the time it was released.

It has been covered by numerous artists from various musical genres, most notably by Peggy Lee, whose 1958 rendition became the most widely known version of "Fever" and the singer's signature song. Lee's version contained rewritten lyrics different from the original and an altered music arrangement. It became a top-five hit on the music charts in the UK and Australia in addition to entering the top ten in the US and the Netherlands. "Fever" was nominated in three categories at the 1st Annual Grammy Awards in 1959, including Record of the Year and Song of the Year.

Other notable cover versions of "Fever" include those by Elvis Presley, Boney M., Madonna, Christina Aguilera, Michael Bublé, The McCoys, La Lupe and Beyoncé. Madonna released it as a single from her fifth studio album, Erotica (1992), in March 1993 through Warner Bros. It topped the charts in Finland and the Hot Dance Club Songs in the US in addition to charting in the top 50 in many other countries. Madonna promoted "Fever" by filming and releasing a music video directed by Stéphane Sednaoui and performing the song on several television shows as well as her 1993 The Girlie Show World Tour. Various versions of "Fever" have been used in many films, plays and television shows.

Background and reception
The idea for "Fever" was presented to Otis Blackwell by an old friend, Eddie Cooley, who in 1956 had a hit song called "Priscilla". Blackwell said: "Eddie Cooley was a friend of mine from New York and he called me up and said 'Man, I got an idea for a song called 'Fever', but I can't finish it.' I had to write it under another name because, at that time, I was still under contract to Joe Davis."  John Davenport, the name he used, was the name of Blackwell's stepfather. Little Willie John reportedly disliked the song, but was persuaded to record it, on March 1, 1956, by King Records owner Syd Nathan and arranger and producer Henry Glover. It became the title track for his debut album, Fever, released in 1956. "Fever" is a soul and rhythm and blues minor key opus with an arrangement consisting of low saxophones played by Ray Felder and Rufus "Nose" Gore and guitar by Bill Jennings. The vocal style of Willie John is similar to moaning and he is backed by finger snaps. Bill Dahl from the website AllMusic noted a contrast between the song's "ominous" arrangement and the vocals along with the finger snapping which "marginally lightened the mood".

"Fever" was released as a single in April 1956 and became a double-sided hit along with the top-ten R&B song "Letter from My Darling". "Fever" reached number one for three weeks on the Billboard R&B Best Sellers chart in the United States, peaking at the top on July 21, 1956. It also made the pop charts, peaking at number 24 on the Billboard Best Sellers in Stores. The single sold one million copies in the US. The song won the BMI Award for Best R&B song.

The song was included in Robert Christgau's "Basic Record Library" of 1950s and 1960s recordings, published in Christgau's Record Guide: Rock Albums of the Seventies (1981). He later described it as a very "fervid" song. Bill Dahl from the website AllMusic credited "Fever" for winning the "boisterous teen an across-the-board audience" for Willie John. The writer further opined that the singer's "sweaty case of love-rooted 'Fever' was seemingly grave, judging from his riveting intensity, yet he doesn't sound like he minds at all". NME magazine listed "Fever" as the 96th best song of the 1950s. In his The 1001 Greatest Singles Ever Made list published in 1989, critic Dave Marsh ranked "Fever" at the position of 109. The song was included on the greatest hits albums Fever: The Best of Little Willie John (1993) and The Very Best of Little Willie John (2001).

Charts

Peggy Lee version

Background and composition
In May 1958, Peggy Lee recorded a cover version of "Fever" in Hollywood, which featured significantly rewritten lyrics composed by Lee herself without credit. The song was not included on Lee's album, Things Are Swingin', when it was first released in 1959; however it was listed as a bonus track on its 2004 reissue release. The uncopyrighted lyrics by Lee featured historical invocations (including the verses beginning "Romeo loved Juliet," and "Captain Smith and Pocahontas") and are now generally thought of as a standard part of the song; they have been included in most subsequent covers of "Fever".

Lee's cover, arranged by the singer herself with arranger/conductor Jack Marshall, was a slower-tempo version than the original; it was described as being in "torchy lounge" mode, accompanied only by bass (played by Joe Mondragon) and a very limited drum set (played in part with fingers by Shelly Manne), while the finger snaps were provided either by the singer herself, by Howard Roberts, the guitarist for the date, who set aside his guitar for this number, or possibly even by the producer, Dave Cavanaugh. Lee's rendition was further described as "smooth, sultry". It is written in the key of A Minor in a medium swing tempo with 135 beats per minute; Lee's vocals span from the musical note of G3 to B4.

Reception and accolades
A writer of the website NPR deemed "Fever" as Lee's "most memorable tune" and considered it to be "slinky and inimitable". He went on to note that it displayed characteristics which were most remembered about the singer – "her playful delivery, charisma and sexuality". John Bush from the website AllMusic opined that the singer excelled in sounding "sizzling" in the song. John Fordham writing for The Guardian felt that the "heated" atmosphere heard on Lee's version of "Fever", "has an underlying suggestion that the person raising the temperature for her right now doesn't have to be the one doing it next week".

Lee's version peaked at number eight on the Billboard Hot 100 in the US and spent a total of 12 weeks on that chart. It reached a peak of number five on the UK Singles Chart, where it first appeared on August 15, 1958. A reissue of the single charted again in 1992, appearing at number 75 and staying for only one week. Elsewhere in Europe, Lee's "Fever" peaked at number eight on January 3, 1959, on the Dutch Singles Chart in Netherlands for five consecutive weeks before falling off the chart. The song also peaked at number two on the Australian Singles Chart compiled by Kent Music Report and emerged as the twentieth best-selling single of 1958 in that country.

"Fever" was nominated in the categories for Record of the Year, Song of the Year and Best Female Vocal Performance at the 1st Annual Grammy Awards held in 1959. The track became Lee's signature song and her best-known work in addition to becoming her most successful hit. It was ranked at number 100 in the book and the accompanying list 1001 Songs You Must Hear Before You Die by Robert Dimery.

Charts

Weekly charts

Year-end charts

Madonna version

Background and composition
In 1992, American singer and songwriter Madonna recorded a cover version of "Fever" for her fifth studio album, Erotica (1992). She served as a producer for the song along with Shep Pettibone. Madonna was in the studio putting down tracks for the album and had just recorded a song called "Goodbye to Innocence". She was going through the final stages of production on the song and suddenly started singing the lyrics to "Fever" over "Goodbye to Innocence". Madonna liked the way it sounded so much that she recorded it. In September 2008, Madonna's version was used in television promos for the fifth season of Desperate Housewives.

According to author Rikky Rooksby, Madonna changed the composition of the original version by adding drum rhythms, accompanied by a beatbox sound like snare drums. Removing the chord progression of the original, Madonna introduces original lyrics into the song. Instrumentation of the track includes strings, marimba and finger-pops at various intervals throughout. Rooksby noticed that Madonna sang with a distant and disembodied voice, and relegated it to the dance music accompanying the lyrics.

Chart performance
Although "Fever" was never officially released as a single in the United States, it became a dance hit, becoming Madonna's 15th song to hit number one on the Billboard Hot Dance Club Play chart. It topped the chart for the issue dated May 15, 1993, in its seventh week of ascending. In the United Kingdom, the song debuted at its peak position of number six on the UK Singles Chart on the issue dated April 3, 1993, and had sold 86,077 copies by August 2008. It peaked at number one on the Finnish Singles Chart on April 15, 1993. In Ireland it entered the top ten of the Irish Singles Chart, peaking at the position of six and charting for four weeks. Elsewhere, it peaked at numbers 12 in Italy, 17 in New Zealand, 22 on the Ultratop chart of the Flanders region in Belgium, 31 in France and 51 in Australia.

Critical reception
The Baltimore Sun J. D. Considine praised the song as a "sassy, house-style remake" of the original version. He noted that when Madonna and the team of producers that worked on the album "push beyond the expected... [it] really heats up, providing a sound that is body-conscious in the best sense of the term", exemplifying his statements with "Fever". A writer from Billboard called the song a "house-inflected rendition" and noted it was single-worthy. In August 2018, the magazine named it as the singer's 66th greatest single; "while most versions of this classic smolder, Madonna gets distant and detached, delivering an icy club banger that sounds less like a torch song from yesteryear and more like a soundtrack for anonymous encounters that would make Ms. Lee blush". Hunter Hauk from the Dallas Observer deemed it "subtly soulful and custom made for Madonna's pre-vocal-lesson voice". David Browne of Entertainment Weekly criticized Madonna's voice as "souless", "You and Shep sure do a bang-up job — pun intended — transforming 'Fever,' that old Peggy Lee hit, into a techno drone, but listen to the parched sound emitted from your throat on such tracks. It's cold, deadened, remote." Jude Rogers from The Guardian called it an "unnecessary trance-era update of pop’s most achingly simple song about sex"; nonetheless, she placed the song at number 72 on her ranking of Madonna's singles, in honor of her 60th birthday.

James Masterton stated in his weekly UK chart commentary, that "her crown is intact." Alan Jones from Music Week gave it four out of five, naming it Pick of the Week. He added that "this is fairly tame in original album edit, but packs more punch and dancefloor possibilities in selection of Pettihone/Falcon/Gaeten mixes, and should maintain her now record sequence of consecutive Top 10 hits." The New York Times editor Stephen Holden wrote that "the album's softer moments include a silky hip-hop arrangement of 'Fever'". Author Rikky Rooksby, described it as "unsexy", and called it a "sterile track" which is "certainly misplaced as the second track of [Erotica]". Slant Magazine Sal Cinquemani opined that it's "Madonna’s vocal performance that’s the real star here [...] she may lack Peggy Lee’s command, but she exudes a detached confidence and control that is the pitch-perfect embodiment of Eroticas main thesis: love hurts". Alfred Soto of Stylus Magazine felt that this song has its unique, idiosyncratic energy which he compared with material by Joni Mitchell from her album Blue (1971). The Washington Posts Richard Harrington deemed it a "cool mechanical recitation in which more attention is paid to the pulse of the music than that of the heart."

Music video and live performances
The accompanying music video for "Fever", directed by Stéphane Sednaoui, was shot on April 10–11, 1993 at Greenwich Studios in Miami, Florida, and received its world premiere on May 11, 1993, on MTV. It has since been made commercially available on the DVD collection, The Video Collection 93:99. The music video alternately features Madonna with a red wig and silver bodypaint in a variety of costumes dancing in front of funky, kaleidoscopic backgrounds. It showcases her posing like ancient goddesses. She is enveloped in a flame-like atmosphere and eventually burns up. According to Sednaoui, he wanted to portray the singer "like a provocative saint, somebody that speaks out and tells the truth, and is ready to burn for it"; he also recalled that the executives from Maverick wanted to do "something that's not the [Madonna] we know – more pop, more disco, more club [...] that's why she went all the way, like, 'OK, let's paint'". Charles Aaron writing for Spin magazine classified the clip as "dub". The music video for "Fever" was later published on Madonna's official YouTube channel in February 2018. It was digitally remastered on November 22, 2022. It had amassed almost 2,5 million views as of November 2022.

To start the promotion for Erotica, Madonna performed "Fever" and "Bad Girl" on Saturday Night Live in January 1993. During the 1000th The Arsenio Hall Show, Madonna performed the original version of "Fever" accompanied by a band, wearing a black classic dress and smoking a cigarette. Madonna also performed "Fever" on the 1993 Girlie Show World Tour as the second song from the setlist. After "Erotica", the singer partially strips and proceeds to straddle and dances suggestively with two half-naked male dancers. At the end of the song, Madonna and the two backup dancers descend into a literal ring of fire. On October 8, 2015, Madonna performed an a cappella version of "Fever" during the Saint Paul stop of her Rebel Heart Tour. On November 25, 2019, Madonna performed an a cappella version of "Fever" on her Madame X Tour.

Formats and track listings

 Australian, European, and UK CD maxi-single
 "Fever" (Album Edit) – 4:30
 "Fever" (Hot Sweat 12-inch Mix) – 7:58
 "Fever" (Extended 12-inch Mix) – 6:07
 "Fever" (Shep's Remedy Dub) – 4:31
 "Fever" (Murk Boys Miami Mix) – 7:10
 "Fever" (Murk Boys Deep South Mix) – 6:28

 Digital single – "Bad Girl / Fever"
 "Bad Girl" (Edit) – 4:35
 "Bad Girl" (Extended Mix) – 6:29
 "Fever" (Album Edit) – 4:30
 "Fever" (Edit One) – 4:05
 "Fever" (Extended 12-inch Mix) – 6:07
 "Fever" (Hot Sweat 12-inch Mix) – 7:58
 "Fever" (Murk Boys Deep South Mix) – 6:28
 "Fever" (Murk Boys Miami Mix) – 7:10
 "Fever" (Murk Boys Miami Dub) – 7:12
 "Fever" (Radio Edit/Remix) – 5:09
 "Fever" (Shep's Remedy Dub) – 4:31
 "Fever" (Oscar G's Dope Mix) – 4:55

NOTE: Tracks 8 and 9 are the same version.

Charts

Weekly charts

Year-end charts

Beyoncé version

Background and release
American singer Beyoncé included her version of "Fever" on multiple releases. Her original recording of the song was included on the soundtrack album for the 2003 American musical dramedy film, The Fighting Temptations, in which she also had a leading role. The song was also featured in the film itself, during a scene in which the character Beyoncé portrayed, named Lilly, sang the song in a nightclub while her eventual love interest Darrin (played by Cuba Gooding, Jr.) watches her. Beyoncé's version was produced by Damon Elliott and was recorded by her while she was still working on the 2002 film Austin Powers in Goldmember. Elliott suggested to the singer to record "Fever" as it was one of his favorite songs. When she got a role in The Fighting Temptations, the song seemed "perfect" for it as stated by Elliot. Ed Gonzalez of Slant Magazine provided a positive review for the cover, saying: "The seductive iciness of Peggy Lee's 'Fever' is successfully transplanted with a gumbo sound and sexy Southern comfort."

Beyoncé appeared on The Tonight Show with Jay Leno on September 17, 2003, to promote The Fighting Temptations with a live performance of "Fever". In November 2003, the song was included in the set list of the singer's first headlining solo Dangerously in Love Tour. Beyoncé was backed by four male dancers dressed in white, performing a choreography with her. In a review of the show, Dave Simpson from The Guardian felt that the performance of "Fever" was "a note perfect if pointless version" of the original. In 2004, the song was included on the live album Live at Wembley which was filmed during a London concert as part of the tour. Beyoncé's original recording was additionally included on the track-listing of her first mixtape Speak My Mind released in 2005.

After releasing her first fragrance Heat, Beyoncé re-recorded her version of "Fever" as promotion for the fragrance, using the song in its advertisements. The re-recorded 2010 version of the song was produced by Chink Santana and Beyoncé herself. It was released for digital download on the iTunes Store in the US on February 8, 2010. The next day, it was released in the United Kingdom. In February the following year, "Fever" was included on the track-listing of the extended play (EP) Heat, a limited CD released with the perfume.

Usage in media
As promotion for the fragrance, a TV commercial for Heat was directed by Jake Nava, who had previously worked with Beyoncé on various of her music videos. The commercial features Beyoncé in a red satin dress sweating in a steamy room while the 2010 cover version of "Fever" plays in the background. Throughout the clip, she is seen lying naked in the middle of a room, touching her body, dancing and leaving a trail of fire as she touches a wall. The commercial concludes with Beyoncé walking away from the camera and melting the floor with her footprints. During the end, she turns and says "Catch the fever", the tagline of the fragrance.

In an interview with Women's Wear Daily, the singer described the sexual tone of the video stating: "My sexiest moments are when I'm just getting out of the tub or the shower and I'm clean, so I wanted to incorporate that in the ads. The dress was this liquid-y satin. The song Fever I did years ago and always loved it. [For the commercial] I got to sing it a bit more whispery, more natural." The silky red dress she wears in the video has been noted for exposing partial cleavage. The commercial for the fragrance found controversy in the United Kingdom with the Advertising Standards Authority where it was banned from daytime TV rotation for its "sexy imagery".

Other versions
 Sandra Meade on her 1956 single Fever / Who Spins The Wheel on Calvert Records 103
 Earl Grant on his 1957 debut album The Versatile Earl Grant
 Elvis Presley – Elvis Is Back! (1960)
 Little Caesar & the Romans on their 1961 album Memories Of Those Oldies But Goodies
 The Kingsmen – on their 1964 debut album The Kingsmen In Person
 Helen Shapiro recorded a version of "Fever" in 1964; her cover reached number 38 on the UK Singles Chart on January 23 of the same year.
 Sarah Vaughan on her 1964 album VIVA!
 Claude Nougaro recorded a French version, "Docteur", to his own lyrics in 1964
 The McCoys in 1965 released a version similar to their previous hit "Hang On Sloopy". The McCoys version of "Fever" peaked at number seven on the Billboard Hot 100 and 34 on the German Singles Chart.
 Paul Revere & the Raiders – for their 1965 album Here They Come!
 Bruno Lauzi wrote and recorded in 1966 an Italian language parody, Garibaldi Blues, in which the text is based on an important moment of the Italian Risorgimento, the expedition of the Italian Patriot Giuseppe Garibaldi in Southern Italy (1860) with the Mille (or Expedition of the Thousand).
 James Brown – Cold Sweat (1967). Music critic Robert Christgau opined that "Fever" placed on the album with several other cover versions "smelled a little fishy at the time".
 La Lupe – Queen of Latin Soul (1968). Her version became famous worldwide. On the web site NBCNewYork.com Elizabeth Bougerol called it one of the best versions and essential at Boogaloo parties.
 Buddy Guy from his 1968 album This Is Buddy Guy.
 1969 Chicago Cubs – A version of the song with the same music but different lyrics, called "Pennant Fever", was recorded by seven members of the 1969 Chicago Cubs: Billy Williams, Randy Hundley, Ron Santo, Don Kessinger, Willie Smith, Gene Oliver, and Nate Oliver.
 Junior Wells – in 1969 which appears on the album Live at the Golden Bear.
 Rita Coolidge – for The Lady's Not for Sale (1972) and it became a minor hit in her early career.
 Reggae artist Junior Byles recorded a notable version of "Fever" in 1972, produced by Lee Perry. Approximately four years later, another Perry-produced recording by Susan Cadogan was released, utilizing the same backing track as the Junior Byles version.
 Brian Eno and pub rock band The Winkies recorded "Fever" as part of their 1974 Peel Sessions.
 Suzi Quatro included her own version of "Fever" on Your Mamma Won't Like Me in 1975. Dave Thompson from AllMusic called her cover "lukewarm".
Rita Moreno performed the song on The Muppet Show with Animal on drums in 1976. 
 Madleen Kane released her version in 1978, and it peaked at No. 19 on the Canadian Dance Chart.
 Indian singer Usha Uthup performed the song on various of her concerts (including those in 2010) and included it on the album Usha in Nairobi released in 1978.
 Link Wray released his cover of Fever on the 1979 album Bullshot.
 Lizzy Mercier Descloux recorded a parody of the song entitled "Tumor" on her 1979 album Press Color.
 The Cramps covered "Fever" on their debut album Songs the Lord Taught Us (1980) It was praised by Ned Raggett of AllMusic who felt that it challenged the original.
 Du Du A released a version of the song, entitled "Strast" ("Passion"), on their 1982 debut album Primitivni ples (Primitive Dance).
 The Jam – During their 1982 world tour, the British group covered the song as part of a medley with their own "Pity Poor Alfie" and Ray Charles 1961 song "Hit the Road Jack". A studio version of this (minus the latter song) was released in September 1982 on the B-side of their single "The Bitterest Pill (I Ever Had to Swallow)". The track dubbed as "Pity Poor Alfie/Fever" was also included on many of the group's compilation releases.
 Amanda Lear released a single-only cover of the song in 1982. The cover photo of most single releases was taken by Lear's then-husband, Alain-Philippe Malagnac d'Argens de Villèle. Although "Fever" was not a commercial success and did not chart, it appeared on her hits compilation Super 20 in 1989.
Annabella Lwin recorded the song in 1986 for her first solo album after the breakup of Bow Wow Wow, and it provided the title for the album itself. A music video was released for the song.
 Sumo (band) from his 1989 album Fiebre(fever).
 Charly García – Estaba en llamas Cuando me Acosté (1995) which included a cover version "Fever".
 Eva Cassidy recorded this song in her live album Nightbird in 1996 and her studio album Imagine released posthumously in 2002. 
 Shirley Horn recorded a jazz version of "Fever" on her album The Main Ingredient, at Verve Records in 1998.
 Bob Weir of the Grateful Dead – The song appears on two of Weir's live albums: Live (1998) and Fall 1989: The Long Island Sound (2013). Weir performed the song with the Grateful Dead only once – on September 13, 1987, at the Capital Centre in Landover, Maryland.
 Michael Bublé released his cover of this song on his self named debut album in 2003. Aaron Latham at AllMusic considered it one of the highlights on the album, stating that Bublé "gives it a satiny sheen that the song hasn't seen in years".
 Bette Midler from her 2005 album Bette Midler Sings the Peggy Lee Songbook. In 2006 it reached No. 4 on the U.S. Billboard Dance Chart.
 Lulu Roman – At Last (2013)
 Petula Clark on 2016's From Now On
Circé Deslandes from her 2017 album Femme Louve.
Josh Turner Guitar released a YouTube cover of the song Fever with the talented Allison Young as vocalist and Joshua Lee Turner playing guitar in 2019.
 Danzig (band) – Danzig Sings Elvis (2020)
 Matthew Bellamy (Muse) arranged and sung the song Fever for The Jaded Hearts Club's debut album You've Always Been Here (2020).
 Arielle Dombasle – Iconics (2022)

In other media
 On June 3, 1976, Rita Moreno sang "Fever" on episode 105 of The Muppet Show, accompanied by the drummer Animal, who repeatedly and comically distracted her with aggressive drumming, which she halted by crushing Animal's head between two cymbals, causing him to declare, "That my kind of woman." In a review for The A.V. Club, Erik Adams considered it to be one of the best segments of the series, further hailing it as a "classic of the genre" and suitable for various generations.
 In the seventh-season episode, "The Fabulous Robinson Sisters," of Who's the Boss?, which aired on October 2, 1990, the character Angela Bower (Judith Light) sings "Fever" in a night club where her mother Mona takes her.
 American musician Marc Cohn, with accompanying bassist Jeff Pevar, closed his 1993 appearance on Austin City Limits with a performance of the song.
 In the Star Trek: Deep Space Nine April 22, 1998, episode "His Way", the holographic singer modeled on Major Kira (portrayed by Nana Visitor) sings "Fever" for an audience including Constable Odo.
 During the episode "Marge Simpson in: 'Screaming Yellow Honkers' of The Simpsons tenth season which aired on February 21, 1999, the character Edna Krabappel is seen performing "Fever" while dancing very seductively, much to the chagrin of the audience.
 In the 2001 live-action/animated film, ‘’Osmosis Jones’’, the villainous virus, Thrax (voiced by Laurence Fishburne) frequently sings and hums Peggy Lee’s rendition while causing inflammation within Frank’s (played by Bill Murray) body.
 The 2007 film Spider-Man 3 features a scene where Mary Jane, played by Kirsten Dunst, performs the song while Peter (Tobey Maguire) dances with Gwen (Bryce Dallas Howard).
 In the Gilmore Girls episode "Lorelai? Lorelai?", Babette (Sally Struthers) and Miss Patty (Liz Torres) sing "Fever" as their last karaoke number with Babette dedicating the number to her husband Morey.
 "Fever" was included in the Broadway musical Million Dollar Quartet, which opened in New York in April 2010; it was sung in the Broadway production by Elizabeth Stanley as "Dyanne".
 Christina DeRosa sings "Fever" in Jim Wynorski's 2012 film Gila!
 La Lupe's version of "Fever" was featured on the episode "Angels of Death" of the second season of the TV series Magic City, which aired on June 21, 2013.
 The 2013 documentary film Red Obsession featured Lee's version of "Fever".
 Figure skating world champion Javier Fernández performed part of his Elvis Presley-themed free program to "Fever" during the 2016–17 season.
 On January 30, 2018, reality TV star Dorit Kemsley performed a version of the song with pop star friend Boy George on The Real Housewives of Beverly Hills.
In Season 5, Episode 20 of Charmed, Rose McGowan's character, Paige, sings "Fever" in a nightclub at the end of the episode after having lost her voice at the start of the episode and freezing up on stage.
In Season 8, Episode 1 of Archer, Lana Kane sings "Fever."
The Peggy Lee version of "Fever" is briefly played in the 2020 Netflix miniseries 'The Queen's Gambit' in episode 5.
In Season 11, Episode 1 of American Horror Story: NYC, the song is performed by Kathy Pizazz (played by Patti LuPone) at the Neptune Baths, a gay bathhouse that she owns.

See also
List of Billboard number-one rhythm and blues hits
List of Billboard Hot 100 top 10 singles in 1958
List of Top 25 singles for 1958 in Australia
List of number-one dance singles of 1993 (U.S.)
List of number-one singles of 1993 (Finland)

Footnotes

Sources

External links
 A comprehensive database of Fever cover versions

1956 songs
1958 singles
1965 singles
1966 singles
1982 singles
1993 singles
Songs written by Otis Blackwell
Songs written by Eddie Cooley
Little Willie John songs
Amanda Lear songs
Bette Midler songs
Beyoncé songs
Elvis Presley songs
Eva Cassidy songs
Helen Shapiro songs
Madonna songs
The McCoys songs
Peggy Lee songs
Rita Coolidge songs
Number-one singles in Finland
Grammy Hall of Fame Award recipients
Song recordings produced by Frank Farian
Song recordings produced by Madonna
Song recordings produced by Shep Pettibone
Music videos directed by Stéphane Sednaoui
King Records (United States) singles
Capitol Records singles
Bang Records singles
Maverick Records singles
Sire Records singles
Warner Records singles
Columbia Records singles